{{DISPLAYTITLE:H2O (disambiguation)}}
H2O is the chemical formula for water, meaning that each of its molecules contains one oxygen and two hydrogen atoms.

H2O or H2O may also refer to:

Arts, entertainment and media

Music 
 H2O (American band), a punk band
 H2O (H2O album), 1996
 H2O (Scottish band), a pop band
 H2O (Puerto Rican band), a boy band
 H "Two" O, a British garage duo
 H2O (Hall & Oates album), 1982

Film and television 
 H2O (1929 film), a short silent film by Ralph Steiner
 H2O (2002 film), an Indian Kannada-Tamil bilingual film
 H2O (miniseries), a Canadian TV drama
 H2O: Footprints in the Sand, a Japanese visual novel, game, manga and anime
 H2O: Just Add Water, an Australian TV drama series
 H2O: Mermaid Adventures, an animated web TV series

Other uses
 Properties of water
 H2O Networks, a British telecommunications company
 H2O Wireless, an American telecommunications company
 H2O (web server), a free and open-source web server software
 List of soft drinks by country

See also 

 H20 (disambiguation) (H twenty)
 Hoh (disambiguation) (Hoh or HOH)
 Water (disambiguation)
 Dihydrogen monoxide parody